Baibai may refer to:

Baibai language, a language of Papua New Guinea
Apisai Driu Baibai (born 1970), Fijian sprinter

See also 
 Paipai (disambiguation)
 Pabai